Delegata potestas non potest delegari is a principle in  constitutional and administrative law that means in Latin that "no delegated powers can be further delegated." Alternatively, it can be stated delegatus non potest delegare ("one to whom power is delegated cannot himself further delegate that power").

The principle is present in several jurisdictions such as that of the United States, the United Kingdom and India as well as in Catholic canon law.

Canada
The principle was first articulated in Canada in 1943, in an article in the Canadian Bar Review by John Willis. While it is acknowledged as "the seminal articulation of the law governing the subdelegation of statutory and discretionary powers" and it is still often cited, it has not achieved the rigid standing that was originally intended. The maxim has had some success as an operating principle in the restriction of delegation of legislative and judicial powers, but the demands of modern governmental regulatory practices have inhibited its application in the delegation of administrative powers. Exceptions are rare and dependent on the statute conferring power.

India
In India, the principle is used in Indian Contract Act, 1872 Sec 190 which deals with agency. It was first applied in A K ROY v. State Of Punjab, (1986) 4 SCC 326, that sub delegation of delegated power is ultra vires to the Enabling Act.

United States
In the United States, one of the earliest mentions of the principle occurred when it was cited by counsel for one of the litigants before the Supreme Court of Pennsylvania in 1794, in M'Intire v. Cunningham, 1 Yeates 363 (Pa. 1794). The summary of the case reports, "Mr. Wilson had given no power to Noarth to transact his business; but if he even had, it is a maxim, that delegata potestas non potest delegari."

The maxim was first cited by the Supreme Court of the United States in United States v. Sav. Bank, 104 U.S. 728 (1881) in which the case summary reports that one of the litigants argued, "The duty imposed by statute on the commissioner cannot be delegated to a collector. Delegata potestas non potest delegari."

Australia
In Australia the maxim has been largely superseded by Statute and common law. There is a long line of authorities applying the Carltona principles to Australia.

Though courts have found that where a statute expressly requires a personal action, such delegation is not possible.

In Dooney The High Court of Australia (Callinan J), observed that "No permanent head of a department in the Public Service is expected to discharge personally all the duties which are performed in his name and for which he is accountable to the responsible Minister."

This case law has been backed up by legislation. Section 34AA and 34AAB of the federal governments Acts Interpretation Act 1901 clearly create a statutory power to delegate, contrary to the maxim. The federal legislation is echoed in some state legislation

Section 34AB(1)(b) however prohibits a delegate to further delegate, consequently a Minister delegating to Secretary does not allow the Secretary to delegate to Astt Secretary. The vestiges of maxim have therefore been preserved by the Act.

Catholic canon law

Canon 137 of the 1983 Code of Canon Law states:

§ 1 Ordinary executive power can be delegated either for an individual case or for all cases, unless the law expressly provides otherwise.

§ 2 Executive power delegated by the Apostolic See can be subdelegated, either for an individual case or for all cases, unless the delegation was deliberately given to the individual alone, or unless subdelegation was expressly prohibited.

§ 3 Executive power delegated by another authority having ordinary power, if delegated for all cases, can be subdelegated only for individual cases; if delegated for a determinate act or acts, it cannot be subdelegated, except by the express grant of the person delegating.

§ 4 No subdelegated power can again be subdelegated, unless this was expressly granted by the person delegating.

See also
Carltona principle

References

Brocards (law)
Constitutional law
Jurisprudence of Catholic canon law
Legal rules with Latin names